Luigi Cremonini (born 1939) is an Italian billionaire businessman. He is the chairman of Cremonini SpA and Inalca SpA, and the honorary president of the Chamber of Commerce ItalAfrica Centrale.

Early life
Cremonini was born in 1939, into a poor farming family near Modena, Italy. He studied farming in Bologna. In May 1994, the University of Bologna awarded him the honorary degree in veterinary medicine.

Career
In 1963, Cremonini opened, with his brother Giuseppe a small butcher's shop, the start of the pan-European Cremonini Group, with an annual turnover of meat products of $3.6 billion, and Marr, Italy's largest food-service distributor.

Personal life
Cremonini is married, with four children, and lives in Modena, Italy.

In 1985, he was awarded the Order of Orange-Nassau by the Queen Beatrix and appointed Cavalier of Labour by the President Alessandro Pertini. In October 2009, Cremonini was presented with an "Italy in the World 2009" award at the Italian Embassy in Moscow.

References

1939 births
Living people
Businesspeople from Modena
Italian billionaires